William Field (1774–1837) was a Tasmanian pastoralist, meat contractor and publican.  Born in Enfield, near London, he spent his early working life as a farmer and butcher.  At the age of 26 he was convicted of receiving stolen sheep from his brother, Richard, and transported to Van Diemen's Land in 1806, travelling on the Fortune to Sydney and then the Sophia to Port Dalrymple, leaving behind a wife, Sarah, and a daughter, Ann. Richard had been sentenced to death in April 1800, and then pardoned to be transported for life, and was further pardoned 19 August 1802 on giving surety. By the time his 14-year sentence had been completed Field had already proven himself useful to the new colony as a farmer and merchant. He began living with Elizabeth Richards, who had been sentenced to death in 1806 for stealing cotton and lace, and whose sentence had been commuted to transportation for life, and they had five children, William (1816–??) (married Sarah Lucas, 1839), Thomas (1817–??) (married Elizabeth Lindsay, 1847), Richard (born 1820 who died seven weeks later), John (1821–??) (married Mary Anne Lindsay, 1854), and Charles (1826–??) (married Margaret Eddington, 1848). As a free man he continued acquiring land and cattle and by 1820 had become the main supplier of meat for the Launceston region.
After Field expanded his meat contracting business colony wide, he continued to purchase property and at one point owned over one-third of the land and buildings in Launceston.

Field died in Launceston.

References 
Rubinstein, W (2004).The All-Time Australian 200 Rich List, Allen and Unwin in association with BRW

See also
Cattle King of Van Diemen's Land, William Field (1774–1837) – Claudia M Dean 

1774 births
1837 deaths
Australian pastoralists
People from Enfield, London
People from Launceston, Tasmania
Convicts transported to Australia